Telelogic AB was a software business headquartered in Malmö, Sweden. Telelogic was founded in 1983 as a research and development arm of Televerket, the Swedish department of telecom (now part of TeliaSonera).  It was later acquired by IBM Rational, and exists under the IBM software group.

Telelogic had operations in 22 countries and had been publicly traded since 1999. CEO and President in 2001 was Anders Lidbeck. On June 11, 2007, IBM announced that it had made a cash offer to acquire Telelogic. On August 29, 2007, the European Union opened an investigation into the acquisition. On March 5, 2008, European regulators approved the acquisition of Telelogic by the Swedish IBM subsidiary Watchtower AB.  On April 28, 2008, IBM completed its purchase of Telelogic.

Former Products

 Focal Point  — System for management of product and project portfolios.
 DOORS — Requirements tracking tool.
 System Architect — Enterprise Architecture and Business Architecture modeling tool.
 Tau — SDL and UML modeling tool.
 Synergy — Task-based version control and configuration management system.
 Rhapsody — Systems engineering and executable UML modeling tool.
 DocExpress — Technical documentation tool, discontinued after the acquisition and superseded by Publishing Engine.
 Publishing Engine — Technical documentation tool

All of these products have been continued under IBM's Rational Software division in the systems engineering and Product lifecycle management (PLM) "solutions" software line.

IBM sold System Architect, Focal Point and several other software products to UNICOM Global in 2016.

Acquisitions

Telelogic acquired the following companies between 1999 and 2007:

References 

Unified Modeling Language
Systems Modeling Language
SysML Partners
Software companies of Sweden
Telecommunications companies of Sweden
IBM acquisitions
Defunct software companies of Sweden
Companies established in 1983
Companies based in Malmö